Arun Kumar Bajaj (born June 2, 1983) AKA Needle Man is a machine embroidery artist. He hails from Patiala, India. Bajaj presented a thread painting to Indian prime minister Narendra Modi in January 2018. He has also created portraits of Shaheed Bhagat Singh, Jesus Christ, Guru Gobind Singh, Lord Krishna, Mother Teresa and Chief Minister Parkash Singh Badal.

Personal life

Arun is married to Sanjita Bajaj.

References

External links
 http://www.theoptimistcitizen.com/the-needle-man-of-india-arun-kumar-bajaj/
https://www.entertales.com/arun-bajaj-needle-man-artist/

Living people
1983 births
Indian embroiderers
Indian artists